The 1977 Lamar Cardinals football team represented Lamar University in the 1977 NCAA Division I football season as a member of the Southland Conference.  The Cardinals played their home games at Cardinal Stadium now named Provost Umphrey Stadium in Beaumont, Texas.  Lamar finished the 1977 season with a 2–9 overall record and a 1–4 conference record.  One highlight for the season was that the game against the Southwestern Louisiana Ragin' Cajuns was the fifth-highest-attended game in the history of the stadium, with 17,222 fans in attendance.

Schedule

References

Lamar
Lamar Cardinals football seasons
Lamar Cardinals football